The Białystok Department (German: Kammerdepartement Bialystok, Polish:Departament białostocki) was part of the New East Prussia Province of the Kingdom of Prussia from 1795 to 1807. It was created out of territory annexed in the Third Partition of Poland and included parts of Podlaskie.

Geography
The Białystok Department encompassed territory between East Prussia and the Bug River and Neman river.

Administrative Subdivisions
The department consisted of the following counties 
Bialystok
Bielsk
Bobrz
Dombrowa
Drohiczyn
Kalwary
Lomza
Mariampol
Surasz
Wygry

Government regions of Prussia